Baldwin High School (BHS) is located at 155 Highway 49 West in Milledgeville, Georgia, United States. New additions since 2003 include a classroom wing, a JROTC building, a fine arts wing, cafeteria and a vocational building. Baldwin is the only public high school in Baldwin County, and the largest of the three total high schools. The other two are private schools: John Milledge Academy and Georgia Military College.

Mascot controversy
A Mascot Advisory Committee was formed by the Baldwin County Board of Education in 2016. After a year of discussion, the board decided to retain the "Braves" mascot name but remove some of the stereotypical imagery.

Notable alumni

 Tasha Butts, former basketball player at University of Tennessee, former assistant coach for the women's UCLA Bruins, current assistant coach at Louisiana State University Lady Tigers 
 Earnest Byner, former professional football player for the Cleveland Browns, Washington Redskins, and Baltimore Ravens, and coach with the Ravens and the Tennessee Titans
 Nick Harper, former professional football player with the Tennessee Titans and Indianapolis Colts
 Leroy Hill, professional football player with the Seattle Seahawks
 Maurice Hurt, professional football player with the Washington Redskins
 Darius Marshall, college football player at Marshall University
 Otis Murphy, professional saxophonist
 Audra Smith, college basketball coach
 Malcolm Thomas

References

External links
 
 Baldwin County Schools

Educational institutions established in 1957
Public high schools in Georgia (U.S. state)
Schools in Baldwin County, Georgia
1957 establishments in Georgia (U.S. state)